Marlow is a hamlet in north Herefordshire, England.

The River Clun flows to the west. Immediately to the north and west is the border with Shropshire. On the other side of the Clun (and in Shropshire) is the hamlet of Broadward. Between Marlow and Leintwardine is Stormer Hall. A Roman road runs just to the east of the hamlet; it is today a footpath only.

The placename derives from "place on the boundary hill".

There is a Royal Mail post box in the hamlet.

References

Hamlets in Herefordshire